Maritime history dates back thousands of years. In ancient maritime history, evidence of maritime trade between civilizations dates back at least two millennia. The first prehistoric boats are presumed to have been dugout canoes which were developed independently by various Stone Age populations. In ancient history, various vessels were used for coastal fishing and travel. A mesolithic boatyard has been found from the Isle of Wight in Britain

Austronesian peoples used novel technologies like multihulls, outriggers, crab claw sails, and tanja sails. This enabled the rapid spread of Austronesians into the islands of both the Indian and the Pacific Oceans, known as the Austronesian expansion. They laid the groundwork for the maritime trade routes into South Asia and the Arabian Sea by around 1000 to 600 BC, which would later become the Maritime Silk Road.

Egyptians had trade routes through the Red Sea, importing spices from the "Land of Punt" and from Arabia. By the time of Julius Caesar, several well-established combined land-sea trade routes depended upon water transport through the sea around the rough inland terrain features to its north. Navigation was known in Sumer between the 4th and the 3rd millennium BC. The search for the source of spices in these maritime trade routes later led to the Age of Exploration.

Ancient seafaring

Maritime prehistory
There are indications as stone tools and traces left on a rhinoceros skeleton that suggest early hominids crossed the sea and colonized the Philippine island of Luzon in a time frame as early as 777,000 to 631,000 years ago.

The sea crossing by anatomically modern humans to the Sahul landmass (modern Australia and New Guinea) from the  Sundaland peninsula occurred around 53,000 to 65,000 years ago. Even with the lower sea level of that time, this crossing would have involved travelling out of sight of landthe overall distances involved at the possible crossing points are all over 55 miles. It is likely that large bamboo rafts were used, possibly with a sail of some sort. Up until 58,000 BP, the winds during the Northern Australian wet season were particularly favourable for making this crossing. The reduction in favourable winds after that date fits well with the single colonisation phase of Australia during prehistory.

In the history of whaling, humans are believed to have begun whaling in Korea at least 6000 BC. The oldest known method of catching whales is to simply drive them ashore by placing a number of small boats between the whale and the open sea and attempting to frighten them with noise, activity, and perhaps small, non-lethal weapons such as arrows.

Austronesian expansion

Austronesians used distinctive sailing technologies, namely the catamaran, the outrigger ship, tanja sail and the crab claw sail. This allowed them to colonize a large part of the Indo-Pacific region during the Austronesian expansion starting at around 3000 to 1500 BC, and ending with the colonization of Easter Island and New Zealand in the 10th to 13th centuries AD. Prior to the 16th century Colonial Era, Austronesians were the most widespread ethnolinguistic group, spanning half the planet from Easter Island in the eastern Pacific Ocean to Madagascar in the western Indian Ocean. They also established vast maritime trading networks, among which is the Neolithic precursor to what would become the Maritime Silk Road.

The acquisition of the catamaran and outrigger boat technology by the non-Austronesian peoples in Sri Lanka and southern India is the result of very early Austronesian contact with the region, including the Maldives and Laccadive Islands. This is estimated to have occurred around 1000 to 600 BC and onwards, and led to the development of India and Sri Lanka's own maritime trade networks. This may have possibly included limited colonization that have since been assimilated. This is still evident in Sri Lankan and South Indian languages. For example, Tamil paṭavu, Telugu paḍava, and Kannada paḍahu, all meaning "ship", are all derived from Proto-Hesperonesian *padaw, "sailboat", with Austronesian cognates like Javanese perahu, Kadazan padau, Maranao padaw, Cebuano paráw, Samoan folau, Hawaiian halau, and Māori wharau.

Similarly the first encounter with large sea-going ships by the Chinese is through trade with Southeast Asian Austronesian ships (likely Javanese or Sumatran) during the Han dynasty (220 BC–200 AD) as recorded by the Chinese historian Wan Chen (萬震) in his 3rd century AD book "Strange Things of the South" (Nánzhōu Yìwùzhì — 南州異物志). This led to the development of China's own maritime technologies later on, during the Song dynasty in the 10th to 13th century AD.

At the furthest extents of the Austronesian expansion, colonists from Borneo crossed the Indian Ocean westward to settle in Madagascar and the Comoros by around 500 AD.

In the east, the first true ocean voyage was the colonization of the Northern Marianas Islands of Micronesia from the Philippines. This was followed by more migrations southwards and eastwards to Island Melanesia up to islands beyond the inter-island visibility range like Tonga and Samoa. This region was occupied by the Austronesian Lapita culture. After a gap of about two thousand years, the first Polynesians continued spreading eastwards into the Cook Islands, French Polynesia, Hawaii, Easter Island, and Aotearoa, New Zealand by around AD 700 to 1200.

Austronesian ethnicities used an advanced Navigation system: Orientation at sea is carried out using a variety of different natural signs, and by using a very distinctive astronomy technique called "star path navigation". Basically, the navigators determine the bow of the ship to the islands that are recognized by using the position of rising and setting of certain stars above the horizon.

Māori people of New Zealand are said to have Navigated following the zodiacal constellation of Scorpio, between Libra and Sagittarius in the southern sky positioned at about 16 hours 30 minutes right ascension and 30° south declination to find, Aotearoa, "The Land of the Long, White, Cloud".

Ancient routes and locations
Ancient maritime routes usually began in the Far East or down river from Madhya Pradesh with transshipment via historic Bharuch (Bharakuccha), traversed past the inhospitable coast of today's Iran then split around Hadhramaut into two streams north into the Gulf of Aden and thence into the Levant, or south into Alexandria via Red Sea ports such as Axum. Each major route involved transhipping to pack animal caravan, travel through desert country and risk of bandits and extortionate tolls by local potentiates.

Maritime trade began with safer coastal trade and evolved with the utilization of the monsoon winds, soon resulting in trade crossing boundaries such as the Arabian Sea and the Bay of Bengal. South Asia had multiple maritime trade routes which connected it to Southeast Asia, thereby making the control of one route resulting in maritime monopoly difficult. Indian connections to various Southeast Asian states buffered it from blockages on other routes. By making use of the maritime trade routes, bulk commodity trade became possible for the Romans in the 2nd century BC. A Roman trading vessel could span the Mediterranean in a month at one-sixtieth the cost of over-land routes.

Egypt

The Ancient Egyptians had knowledge of sail construction.

The first warships of Ancient Egypt were constructed during the early Middle Kingdom, and perhaps – at the end of the Old Kingdom, but the first mention and a detailed description of a large enough and heavily armed ship dates from 16th century BC.
"And I ordered to build twelve warships with rams, dedicated to Amun or Sobek, or Maat and Sekhmet, whose image was crowned best bronze noses. Carport and equipped outside rook over the waters, for many paddlers, having covered rowers deck not only from the side, but and top. and they were on board eighteen oars in two rows on the top and sat on two rowers, and the lower – one, a hundred and eight rowers were. And twelve rowers aft worked on three steering oars. And blocked Our Majesty ship inside three partitions (bulkheads) so as not to drown it by ramming the wicked, and the sailors had time to repair the hole. And Our Majesty arranged four towers for archers – two behind, and two on the nose and one above the other small – on the mast with narrow loopholes. they are covered with bronze in the fifth finger (3.2mm), as well as a canopy roof and its rowers. and they have (carried) on the nose three assault heavy crossbow arrows so they lit resin or oil with a salt of Seth (probably nitrate) tore a special blend and punched (?) lead ball with a lot of holes (?), and one of the same at the stern. and long ship seventy five cubits (41m), and the breadth sixteen, and in battle can go three-quarters of iteru per hour (about 6.5 knots)..." The text of the tomb of Amenhotep I (KV39). 
When Thutmose III achieved warships displacement up to 360 tons and carried up to ten new heavy and light to seventeen catapults based bronze springs, called "siege crossbow" – more precisely, siege bows. Still appeared giant catamarans that are heavy warships and times of Ramesses III used even when the Ptolemaic dynasty.

According to the Greek historian Herodotus, Necho II sent out an expedition of Phoenicians, which reputedly, at some point between 610 and before 594 BC, sailed in three years from the Red Sea around Africa to the mouth of the Nile. Some Egyptologists dispute that an Egyptian Pharaoh would authorize such an expedition, except for the reason of trade in the ancient maritime routes.

The belief in Herodotus' account, handed down to him by oral tradition, is primarily because he stated with disbelief that the Phoenicians "as they sailed on a westerly course round the southern end of Libya (Africa), they had the sun on their right – to northward of them" (The Histories 4.42) – in Herodotus' time it was not generally known that Africa was surrounded by an ocean (with the southern part of Africa being thought connected to Asia). So fantastic an assertion is this of a typical example of some seafarers' story and Herodotus therefore may never have mentioned it, at all, had it not been based on facts and made with the according insistence.

This early description of Necho's expedition as a whole is contentious, though; it is recommended that one keep an open mind on the subject; but Strabo, Polybius, and Ptolemy doubted the description. Egyptologist A. B. Lloyd suggests that the Greeks at this time understood that anyone going south far enough and then turning west would have the Sun on their right but found it unbelievable that Africa reached so far south. He suggests that "It is extremely unlikely that an Egyptian king would, or could, have acted as Necho is depicted as doing" and that the story might have been triggered by the failure of Sataspes' attempt to circumnavigate Africa under Xerxes the Great. Regardless, it was believed by Herodotus and Pliny.

Much earlier, the Sea Peoples was a confederacy of seafaring raiders who sailed into the eastern shores of the Mediterranean, caused political unrest, and attempted to enter or control Egyptian territory during the late 19th dynasty, and especially during Year 8 of Ramesses III of the 20th Dynasty. The Egyptian Pharaoh Merneptah explicitly refers to them by the term "the foreign-countries (or 'peoples') of the sea" in his Great Karnak Inscription.  Although some scholars believe that they "invaded" Cyprus and the Levant, this hypothesis is disputed.

Kingdom of Punt

In ancient times the Kingdom of Punt, which is believed by several Egyptologists to have been situated in the area of modern-day Somalia, had a steady trade link with the Ancient Egyptians and exported the precious natural resources such as myrrh, frankincense and gum. This trade network continued all the way into the classical era. The city states of Mossylon, Opone, Malao, Mundus and Tabae in Somalia engaged in a lucrative trade network connecting Somali merchants with Phoenicia, Ptolemic Egypt, Greece, Parthian Persia, Saba, Nabataea and the Roman Empire. Somali sailors used the ancient Somali maritime vessel known as the beden to transport their cargo.

The Mediterranean
Minoan traders from Crete were active in the eastern Mediterranean by the 2nd millennium BC. The Phoenicians were an ancient civilization centered in the north of ancient Canaan, with its heartland along the coast of modern-day Lebanon, Syria and northern Israel. Phoenician civilization was an enterprising maritime trading culture that spread across the Mediterranean during the first millennium BC, between the period of 1200 BC to 900 BC. Though ancient boundaries of such city-centered cultures fluctuated, the city of Tyre seems to have been the southernmost. Sarepta between Sidon and Tyre, is the most thoroughly excavated city of the Phoenician homeland. The Phoenicians often traded by means of a galley, a man-powered sailing vessel. They were the first civilization to create the bireme.  There is still debate on the subject of whether the Canaanites and Phoenicians were different peoples or not.

The Mediterranean was the source of the vessel, galley, developed before 1000 BC, and development of nautical technology supported the expansion of Mediterranean culture. The Greek trireme was the most common ship of the ancient Mediterranean world, employing the propulsion power of oarsmen. Mediterranean peoples developed lighthouse technology and built large fire-based lighthouses, most notably the Lighthouse of Alexandria, built in the 3rd century BC (between 285 and 247 BC) on the island of Pharos in Alexandria, Egypt.

Many in ancient western societies, such as Ancient Greece, were in awe of the seas and deified them, believing that man no longer belonged to himself when once he embarked on a sea voyage. They believed that he was liable to be sacrificed at any time to the anger of the great Sea God. Before the Greeks, the Carians were an early Mediterranean seagoing people that travelled far. Early writers do not give a good idea about the progress of navigation nor that of the man's seamanship. One of the early stories of seafaring was that of Odysseus.

In Greek mythology, the Argonauts were a band of heroes who, in the years before the Trojan War, accompanied Jason to Colchis in his quest to find the Golden Fleece. Their name comes from their ship, the Argo which in turn was named after its builder Argus. Thus, "Argonauts" literally means "Argo sailors". The voyage of the Greek navigator Pytheas of Massalia is an example of a very early voyage.  A competent astronomer and geographer, Pytheas ventured from Greece to Western Europe and the British Isles.

The periplus, literally "a sailing-around', in the ancient navigation of Phoenicians, Greeks, and Romans was a manuscript document that listed in order the ports and coastal landmarks, with approximate distances between, that the captain of a vessel could expect to find along a shore. Several examples of periploi have survived.

Piracy, which is a robbery committed at sea or sometimes on the shore, dates back to Classical Antiquity and, in all likelihood, much further. The Tyrrhenians, Illyrians and Thracians were known as pirates in ancient times. The island of Lemnos long resisted Greek influence and remained a haven for Thracian pirates. By the 1st century BC, there were pirate states along the Anatolian coast, threatening the commerce of the Roman Empire.

The earliest seagoing culture in the Mediterranean is associated with Cardium pottery. Their earliest impressed ware sites, dating to 6400–6200 BC, are in Epirus and Corfu. Settlements then appear in Albania and Dalmatia on the eastern Adriatic coast dating to between 6100 and 5900 BC. The earliest date in Italy comes from Coppa Nevigata on the Adriatic coast of southern Italy, perhaps as early as 6000 cal B.C. Also during Su Carroppu culture in Sardinia, already in its early stages (low strata into Su Coloru cave, c. 6000 BC) early examples of cardium pottery appear.  Northward and westward all secure radiocarbon dates are identical to those for Iberia c. 5500 cal BC, which indicates a rapid spread of cardium and related cultures: 2,000 km from the gulf of Genoa to the estuary of the Mondego in probably no more than 100–200 years. This suggests a seafaring expansion by planting colonies along the coast.

The Persian Wars

In Ionia (the modern Aegean coast of Turkey) the Greek cities, which included great centres such as Miletus and Halicarnassus, were unable to maintain their independence and came under the rule of the Persian Empire in the mid-6th century BC. In 499 BC the Greeks rose in the Ionian Revolt, and Athens and some other Greek cities went to their aid. In 490 BC, the Persian Great King, Darius I, having suppressed the Ionian cities, sent a fleet to punish the Greeks. The Persians landed in Attica, but were defeated at the Battle of Marathon by a Greek army led by the Athenian general Miltiades. The burial mound of the Athenian dead can still be seen at Marathon. Ten years later Darius' successor, Xerxes I, sent a much more powerful force by land. After being delayed by the Spartan King Leonidas I at Thermopylae, Xerxes advanced into Attica, where he captured and burned Athens. But the Athenians had evacuated the city by sea, and under Themistocles they defeated the Persian fleet at the Battle of Salamis. A year later, the Greeks, under the Spartan Pausanias, defeated the Persian army at Plataea. The Athenian fleet then turned to chasing the Persians out of the Aegean Sea, and in 478 BC they captured Byzantium. In the course of doing so Athens enrolled all the island states and some mainland allies into an alliance, called the Delian League because its treasury was kept on the sacred island of Delos. The Spartans, although they had taken part in the war, withdrew into isolation after it, allowing Athens to establish unchallenged naval and commercial power.

Punic Wars

The Punic Wars  were a series of three wars fought between Rome and Carthage. The main cause of the Punic Wars was the clash of interests between the existing Carthaginian Empire and the expanding Roman sphere of influence. The Romans were initially interested in expansion via Sicily, part of which lay under Carthaginian control. At the start of the first Punic War, Carthage was the dominant power of the Mediterranean, with an extensive maritime empire, while Rome was the rapidly ascending power in Italy.  By the end of the third war, after the deaths of many hundreds of thousands of soldiers from both sides, Rome had conquered Carthage's empire and razed the city, becoming in the process the most powerful state of the Western Mediterranean. With the end of the Macedonian wars – which ran concurrently with the Punic wars – and the defeat of the Seleucid Emperor Antiochus III the Great in the Roman-Syrian War (Treaty of Apamea, 188 BC) in the eastern sea, Rome emerged as the dominant Mediterranean power and the most powerful city in the classical world. This was a turning point that meant that the civilization of the ancient Mediterranean would pass to the modern world via Europe instead of Africa.

Pre-Roman Britain

The Coracle, a small single-passenger-sized float, has been used in Britain since before the first Roman invasion as noted by the invaders. Coracles are round or oval in shape, made of a wooden frame with a hide stretched over it then tarred to provide waterproofing. Being so light, an operator can carry the light craft over the shoulder. They are capable of operating in mere inches of water due to the keel-less hull. The early people of Wales used these boats for fishing and light travel and updated models are still in use to this day on the rivers of Scotland and Wales.

Early Britons also used the world-common hollowed tree trunk canoe. Examples of these canoes have been found buried in marshes and mud banks of rivers at lengths of upward eight feet.

In 1992 a notable archaeological find, named the "Dover Bronze Age Boat", was unearthed from beneath what is modern day Dover, England. The Bronze Age boat which is about 9.5 meters long × 2.3 meters is believed to have been a seagoing vessel. Carbon dating reveals that the craft dating from approximately 1600 BC might be the oldest known sea-going boat. The hull was of half oak logs and side panels also of oak were stitched on with yew lashings. Both the straight-grained oak and yew bindings are now extinct as a shipbuilding method in England. The boat could have easily carried a significant amount of cargo and with a strong crew may have been able to traverse near thirty nautical miles in a day.

Northern Europe
The Norsemen, or 'people from the North', were people from southern and central Scandinavia which established states and settlements Northern Europe from the late 8th century to the 11th century. Vikings has been a common term for Norsemen in the early medieval period, especially in connection with raids and monastic plundering made by Norsemen in Great Britain and Ireland.

Leif Ericson was an Icelandic explorer known to be the first European to have landed in North America (presumably in Newfoundland, Canada). During a stay in Norway, Leif Ericsson converted to Christianity, like many Norse of that time. He also went to Norway to serve the King of Norway, Olaf Tryggvason. When he returned to Greenland, he bought the boat of Bjarni Herjólfsson and set out to explore the land that Bjarni had found (located west of Greenland), which was, in fact, Newfoundland, in Canada. The Saga of the Greenlanders tells that Leif set out around the year 1000 to follow Bjarni's route with 15 crew members, but going north.

Nusantara region 

The Austronesian people from Nusantara were already accomplished sailors since at least 1500 years B.C. During that era the distribution of kapur Barus already reached ancient Egypt.

The Austronesian people also reached Madagascar in the early 1st millennium AD and colonized it. A Chinese record in 200 AD, describes the K'un-lun po (meaning "ship/perahu from K'un-lun" — Either Java or Sumatra) as being capable of carrying 600–700 people and 250–1000 tons of cargo. In 945–946 the Malays of Srivijaya or the Javanese of Medang attacked east Africa, over 7000 km away. They arrived in the coast of Tanganyika and Mozambique with 1000 boats and attempted to take the citadel of Qanbaloh, though eventually failed. The reason of the attack is because that place had goods suitable for their country and for China, such as ivory, tortoise shells, panther skins, and ambergris, and also because they wanted black slaves from Bantu people (called Zeng or Zenj by Arabs, Jenggi by Javanese) who were strong and make good slaves. The existence of black Africans was recorded until the 15th century in Old Javanese inscriptions and the Javanese were still recorded as exporting black slaves during the Ming dynasty era. By the 8th or 9th century A.D., ancient Indonesian ships may have already reached as far as Ghana, likely using the outrigger Borobudur ship and the K'un-lun po or jong.

Indian subcontinent

In the Indian maritime history, the world's first tidal dock was built in phase II of Lothal during the Harappan civilisation near the present day Mangrol harbour on the Gujarat coast. Other ports were probably at Balakot and Dwarka. However, it is probable that many small-scale ports, and not massive ports, were used for the Harappan maritime trade. Ships from the harbour at these ancient port cities established trade with Mesopotamia, where the Indus Valley was known as Meluhha.

Emperor Chandragupta Maurya's Prime Minister Kautilya's Arthashastra devotes a full chapter on the state department of waterways under navadhyaksha (Sanskrit for Superintendent of ships) . The term, nava dvipantaragamanam (Sanskrit for sailing to other lands by ships) appears in this book in addition to appearing in the Buddhist text, Baudhayana Dharmasastra as the interpretation of the term, Samudrasamyanam.

The Maritime history of Kalinga (now Odisha) is an important highlight of the traditions of Indian maritime history as it was influential in establishing trading links with Southeast Asia along the Maritime Silk Road. The people of this region of eastern India along the coast of the Bay of Bengal sailed up and down the Indian coast, and travelled to Indo China and throughout Maritime Southeast Asia, introducing elements of their culture to the people with whom they traded. The 6th century Manjusrimulakalpa mentions the Bay of Bengal as 'Kalingodra' and historically the Bay of Bengal has been called 'Kalinga Sagara' (both Kalingodra and Kalinga Sagara mean Kalinga Sea), indicating the importance of Kalinga in the maritime trade.

The Tamil Chola Empire possessed the largest naval force of Indian subcontinent to have until modern times and represented the zenith of ancient Indian sea power. Chola Emperor Rajendra Chola had established his rule extending up from India (coramandal coast or present day coast of southern part of Andhra Pradesh and Tamil Nadu) to South East Asia with Chola Navy. Rajendra Chola annexed during his overseas conquests Sri Lanka, Maldives, islands of Andaman, Nicobar, Lakshadweep, parts of the Malay Peninsula and Indonesian archipelago. Through conquest of the Srivijaya Empire, the Cholas secured the sea trade road to China.

China

In ancient China, during the Spring and Autumn period (722 BC–481 BC), large rectangular-based barge-like ships with layered decks and cabins with ramparts acted as floating fortresses on wide rivers and lakes. These were called 'castle ships' ('lou chuan'), yet there were 4 other ship types known in that period, including a ramming vessel. During the short-lived Qin Dynasty (221 BC-207 BC) the Chinese sailed south into the South China Sea during their invasion of Annam, modern Vietnam.

During the Han Dynasty (202 BC–220 AD), a ship with a stern-mounted steering rudder along with masts and sails was innovated, known as the junk in Western terminology. The Chinese had been sailing through the Indian Ocean since the 2nd century BC, with their travels to Kanchipuram in India. This was followed up by many recorded maritime travelers following the same route to India, including Faxian, Zhiyan, Tanwujie, etc. Like in the Western tradition, the earlier Zhou Dynasty Chinese also made use of the floating pontoon bridge, which became a valuable means to blockade the entire Yangtze River during Gongsun Shu's rebellion against the re-established Han government in 33 AD. Although first described in ancient Ptolemaic Egypt, the Song Dynasty scientist Shen Kuo (1031–1095) was the first to describe the use of the drydock system in China to repair boats out of water. The canal pound lock was invented in China during the previous century, while Shen Kuo wrote of its effectiveness in his day, writing that ships no longer had the grievances of the old flash lock design and no longer had to be hauled over long distances (meaning heavier ships with heavier cargo of goods could traverse the waterways of China).  There were many other improvements to nautical technology during the Song period as well, including crossbeams bracing the ribs of ships to strengthen them, rudders that could be raised or lowered to allow ships to travel in a wider range of water depths, and the teeth of anchors arranged circularly instead of in one direction, "making them more reliable".

Although there were numerous naval battles beforehand, China's first permanent standing navy was established in 1132 during the Song Dynasty (960–1279 AD). Gunpowder warfare at sea was also first known in China, with battles such as the Battle of Caishi and the Battle of Tangdao on the Yangtze River in 1161 AD during the Jin–Song wars. One of the most important books of medieval maritime literature was Zhu Yu's Pingzhou Table Talks of 1119 AD. Although the Chinese scientist Shen Kuo (1031–1095) was the first to describe the magnetic-needle compass, Zhu Yu's book was the first to specify its use for navigation at sea. Zhu Yu's book also described watertight bulkhead compartments in the hull of Chinese ships, which prevented sinking when heavily damaged in one compartment. Although the drydock was known, Zhu Yu wrote of expert divers who were often used to repair boats that were damaged and still submersed in water. Divers in China continued to have a maritime significance, as the later Ming Dynasty author Song Yingxing (1587–1666) wrote about pearl divers who used snorkeling gear (a watertight leather face mask and breathing tube secured with tin rings) to breathe underwater while tied by the waist to the ship in order to be secure while hunting for pearls.

Japan

Japan had a navy by at least the 6th century, with their invasions and involvement in political alliances during the Three Kingdoms of Korea. A joint alliance between the Korean Silla Kingdom and the Chinese Tang Dynasty (618–907 AD) heavily defeated the Japanese and their Korean allies of Baekje in the Battle of Baekgang on August 27 to August 28 of the year 663 AD. This decisive victory expelled the Japanese force from Korea and allowed the Tang and Silla to conquer Goguryeo.

See also

History of navigation
Maritime timeline
Naumachia
Pre-Columbian transoceanic contact theories
Pre-Columbian rafts

Notes

References

 Hattendorf, John B. (2007). Oxford Encyclopedia of Maritime History.
 Denemark, Robert Allen; el al. (2000). World System History: The Social Science of Long-Term Change. Routledge. .
 Hall, John Whitney (1991). Cambridge History of Japan, Volume 4. New York: Cambridge University Press. .

Maritime history